Norene is an unincorporated community in Wilson County, in the U.S. state of Tennessee. It is located along Tennessee State Route 266. The community has a general store, post office and churches.

Demographics

History
The community was once called "Henderson's Cross Roads" by the local post office upon establishment in 1878.  The community's name was officially changed to Norene on February 17, 1915.
By 1916 it was one of the eight largest villages in Wilson County with residents numbering 100.  By 1930 the population had increased to 120.

Education
Norene is served by Wilson County Schools. Its zoned schools are Watertown Elementary School, Watertown Middle School, and Watertown High School.

Photo gallery

Notes

Unincorporated communities in Wilson County, Tennessee
Unincorporated communities in Tennessee
Populated places established in 1878